Arasia is a genus of South Pacific jumping spiders that was first described by Eugène Louis Simon in 1901.  it contains only three species, found only in Australia and Papua New Guinea: A. eucalypti, A. mollicoma, and A. mullion.

References

Salticidae genera
Salticidae
Spiders of Australia